is a Japanese professional shogi player ranked 7-dan.

Early life, amateur shogi and apprentice professional
Seiya  Kondō was born on July 25, 1996, in Yachiyo, Chiba. He learned shogi from his father. In 2007, he finished runner-up in the 32nd  as a fifth-grade elementary school student, and then later that same year entered the Japan Shogi Association's apprentice school as a student of shogi professional Kazuharu Shoshi at the rank of 6-kyū.

Kondō was promoted to the rank of 3-dan in October 2013. He obtained professional status and the rank of 4-dan on October 1, 2015, after finishing tied for first with Satoshi Takano in the 57th 3-dan League (April 2015September 2015) with a record of 13 wins and 5 losses.

Promotion history
The promotion history for Kondō is as follows:
 6-kyū: September 2007
 3-dan: October 2013
 4-dan: October 1, 2015
 5-dan: March 2, 2017
 6-dan: March 5, 2019
 7-dan: March 11, 2020

References

External links
ShogiHub: Professional Player Info · Kondou, Seiya

Japanese shogi players
Living people
People from Yachiyo, Chiba
Professional shogi players
Professional shogi players from Chiba Prefecture
1996 births